Özcan Kızıltan (born 12 July 1959) is a Turkish football coach and former player.

References

1959 births
Living people
Turkish footballers
Association football midfielders
Mersin İdman Yurdu footballers
Fenerbahçe S.K. footballers
Sakaryaspor footballers
Turkish football managers
Gençlerbirliği S.K. non-playing staff
Bucaspor managers
Sakaryaspor managers
Göztepe S.K. managers
Boluspor managers
Kartalspor managers
Yeni Malatyaspor managers
Sarıyer S.K. managers